Geco may refer to:

 Geco (artist), Italian street artist
 Geco (Geophysical Company of Norway)
 Gustav Genschow & Co., German company; maker of bullets found in the investigation of the Murders of Gene and Eugene Thomas

See also 
 GECO, the General Engineering Company of Ontario